is a railway station on the Keiyō Line in Edogawa, Tokyo, Japan, operated by the East Japan Railway Company (JR East).

Lines
Only local (all stations) Keiyō Line services stop at this station. Musashino Line through services to and from  also stop here.

Station layout
The elevated station consists of an island platform serving two tracks, with outer passing tracks on either side to allow non-stop trains to overtake stopping trains.

Platforms

History
The station opened on 1 December 1988.

Station numbering was introduced in 2016 with Kasai Rinkai Park being assigned station number JE06.

Passenger statistics
In fiscal 2011, the station was used by an average of 11,644 passengers daily (boarding passengers only). The passenger figures for previous years are as shown below.

Surrounding area
 Kasai Rinkai Park, after which the station is named
 Edogawa Stadium
 Metropolitan Central Wholesale Market
 National Route 357

Kasai Rinkai Park
The station is located at the entrance to Kasai Rinkai Park, a municipal park featuring the Diamond and Flower Ferris Wheel, Tokyo Sea Life Park and a bird sanctuary.

See also

 List of railway stations in Japan

References

External links

 Kasai-Rinkai Park Station information (JR East) 

Railway stations in Tokyo
Railway stations in Japan opened in 1988
Stations of East Japan Railway Company
1988 establishments in Japan